Myx Music Awards 2011 is the 6th Myx music awards since it started in 2006. The music awards now include a category for favorite K-Pop Video.

List of nominees and winners
Winners are in bold text

Favorite Music Video
"Disney" – Tanya Markova
"Jeepney Love Story" – Yeng Constantino (Winner)
"Kung Wala Na Nga" – 6cyclemind feat. Kean Cipriano & Yeng Constantino
"Lakad" – Sandwich
"Liwanag - Callalily

Favorite Song
"Cariño Brutal" – Slapshock
"Disney" – Tanya Markova
"Jeepney Love Story" – Yeng Constantino (Winner)
"Kung Wala Na Nga" – 6cyclemind feat. Kean Cipriano & Yeng Constantino
"Pakiusap Lang (Lasingin N'yo Ako)" – Parokya Ni Edgar

Favorite Artist
Callalily
Christian Bautista
Parokya Ni Edgar
Sandwich (Winner)
Yeng Constantino

Favorite Female Artist
Juris
KC Concepcion
Kyla
Sarah Geronimo
Yeng Constantino (Winner)

Favorite Male Artist
Billy Crawford
Christian Bautista 
Gloc-9 (Winner)
Piolo Pascual
Rico Blanco

Favorite Group
6cyclemind
Callalily
Parokya Ni Edgar (Winner)
Sandwich
Slapshock

Favorite Mellow Video
"Di Lang Ikaw" – Juris
"I Remember The Girl" – Christian Bautista (Winner)
"Not Like The Movies" – KC Concepcion
"Sino Nga Ba S'ya" – Sarah Geronimo
"You Don't Know" – Regine Velasquez

Favorite Rock Video
"A Call To Arms" – Urbandub
"Alay" – Kamikazee
"Lakad" – Sandwich (Winner)
"Neon Lights" – Rico Blanco
"What's Your Poison" – Chicosci

Favorite Urban Video
"Back To Love" - Quest (Winner)
"Can't Get Enough" – Young JV
"Fly With Me" – Duncan Ramos
"I Want You Back" – Krazykyle feat. Luke Mejares
"Watchin'" Me – Hi-C

Favorite New Artist
Franco
General Luna
Kiss Jane
Quest
Tanya Markova (Winner)

Favorite Indie Artist
Gaijin
Mr. Bones and The Boneyard Circus (Winner)
SLEX
Techy Romantics
Turbo Goth

Favorite Collaboration
"Kung Wala Na Nga" – 6cyclemind feat. Kean Cipriano & Yeng Constantino (Winner)
"Martilyo" – Gloc-9 feat. Letter Day Story
"Please Be Careful With My Heart" – Christian Bautista & Sarah Geronimo
"Simulan Na Natin" – Kenyo feat. Hi-C
"You've Got A Friend" – Billy Crawford & Nikki Gil

Favorite Remake
"Beautiful Girl" – Christian Bautista (Winner)
"Himala" – Jay-R
"Kung Wala Ka" – Nikki Gil
"Too much Love Will Kill You" – Jovit Baldivino
"Yakap" – Ogie Alcasid

Favorite Media Soundtrack
"In Your Eyes" – Rachelle Ann Go (In Your Eyes)
Kaya Mo – Protein Shake feat. Ney Dimaculangan & Kean Cipriano (RPG Metanoia) (Winner)
"Kung Tayo'y Magkakalayo" – Gary Valenciano (Kung Tayo'y Magkakalayo)
"Love Will Keep Us Together" – Sarah Geronimo (Hating Kapatid)
"Miss You Like Crazy" – Erik Santos (Miss You Like Crazy)

Favorite Guest Appearance in a Music Video
Angel Locsin ("Magkaibang Mundo" – Hale) (Winner)
Anne Curtis ("Breathe Again" – Chicosci)
Dingdong Dantes & Marian Rivera ("You Don't Know" – Regine Velasquez)
Piolo Pascual ("Jeepney Love Story" – Yeng Constantino)
Richard Gutierrez ("Today I'll See The Sun" – Frencheska Farr)

Favorite Myx Celebrity VJ
Aljur Abrenica
Empress
Parokya Ni Edgar
Sam Milby
Yeng Constantino (Winner)

Favorite Myx Live! Performance
Neocolors
Noel Cabangon
Slapshock (Winner)
Tanya Markova
The Company

Favorite International Video
 "Baby" – Justin Bieber feat. Ludacris
 "Just The Way You Are" – Bruno Mars (Winner)
 "Love The Way You Lie" – Eminem feat. Rihanna
 "Pyramid" – Charice feat. Iyaz
 "Telephone" – Lady Gaga feat. Beyoncé

Favorite K-Pop Video
"Beautiful" – Beast
"Bingeul Bingeul" – U-KISS
"Bonamana" – Super Junior
"Shock (Beast song)" – Highlight (band) (Winner)
"Run Devil Run" – Girls' Generation

Myx Magna Award
Regine Velasquez (Winner)

References

External links
 http://www.myxph.com/Myx-Music-Awards-Voting.aspx

Philippine music awards